This is a list of electoral results for the electoral district of Belyando in Queensland state elections.

Members for Belyando

Election results

Elections in the 1970s

Elections in the 1950s

References

Queensland state electoral results by district